is a passenger railway station  located in the town of Yurihama, Tōhaku District, Tottori Prefecture, Japan. It is operated by the West Japan Railway Company (JR West).

Lines

Station layout
The station consists of one ground-level side platform and one island platform connected by a  footbridge to the station building. However, from 2003 the outer track (Track 3) on the island platform was removed, making the station effectively a two side platform configuration. Platform 2 on the former island platform is used only for passing limited express trains, and as a general rule, trains that stop in both directions use Platform 1 on the side of the station building.  The station is unattended.

Platforms

History
Matsuzaka Station opened on March 15, 1904. With the privatization of the Japan National Railways (JNR) on April 1, 1987, the station came under the aegis of the West Japan Railway Company. A new station building was completed in July 2022.

Passenger statistics
In fiscal 2018, the station was used by an average of 420 passengers daily.

Surrounding area
Lake Tōgō
Yurihama Town Office Tōgō Office

See also
List of railway stations in Japan

References

External links 

 Matsuzaki Station from JR-Odekake.net 

Railway stations in Tottori Prefecture
Stations of West Japan Railway Company
Sanin Main Line
Railway stations in Japan opened in 1904
Yurihama, Tottori